Gujrat Division (Urdu, ; also called 10th Division) is an administrative division of the Punjab province of Pakistan, with it being headquartered in the Gujrat city. It came into being on 17 August 2022 after districts Gujrat, Mandi Bahauddin, and Hafizabad of the Gujranwala Division were grouped together in a separate division, increasing the number of divisions in the province to ten. The Wazirabad District (newly created) was later on 14 October 2022 added under Gujrat Division making it a total of four districts. The change was made official after a notification issued by the Board of Revenue under section 5 of the Punjab Land Revenue Act 1967. Before this bifurcation, Gujranwala division was the largest in the province, with a population of approximately 16 million.
Ahmad Kamal Maan was notified as the first commissioner of the division  and Mohammad Akhtar Abbas will be the Regional police officer (RPO).

Later on 15 February 2023 The Punjab caretaker government has suspended the notifications of the newly established division of Gujrat, Newly created district Wazirabad and three new Tehsils in the Division.

According to the new notification issued by the Board of Revenue, the notifications of Gujrat Division, Wazirabad District, three new tehsils Jalalpur Jattan and Kunjah in Gujrat District and Alipur Chattha Tehsil in Wazirabad District(Newly Created) have been suspended.
According to the new notification, the suspension is valid till the general election in Punjab.

Later on 21 February 2023, Lahore High Court suspended caretaker government's order and resume Gujrat as division.

Location

Gujrat Division is located at about 32.5 degrees north latitude and 74.0 degrees longitude in north Pakistan in the Punjab region. It lies on the Pakistan national highway N-5 about halfway between Islamabad and Lahore. Gujrat division is bordered by 5 other divisions including  Rawalpindi Division, Sargodha Division, Faisalabad Division, Lahore Division and Gujranwala Division.

Gujrat division has two rivers Chenab River and Jhelum River.

Administration
Gujrat Division consists of four districts and 12 tehsils.

Gujrat is one of the 10 divisions of Punjab, Pakistan. Division was created on 17 August 2022 after splinting Gujranwala Division into two divisions.

See also
Districts in Punjab
Gujrat District
Mandi Bahauddin District
Hafizabad District
District Wazirabad

References

Divisions of Punjab, Pakistan